Maurice Ringot (1880 in Bergues – 1951) was a French sculptor, best known for his war memorials. He also did work for churches and private individuals.

Early life
Ringot came from a family of marbriers and sculptors, and studied in local colleges before entering the École des Beaux-Arts in Lille and then Paris. After his studies he returned to Bergues, married Hélène Sagary and set up his studio in the rue de l'Arsenal. There he produced his first major monument: the figure of Johannes Gutenberg for the front of the then Le Nord Maritime newspaper building in Dunkirk.  This work is now in the Jean Bart school.

In 1910 he moved to Malo-les-Bains and employed several workers and artists, one of whom was Louis Piron. Seven years later Ringot moved to the Seine-Maritime region and lived and worked there for several years before returning to Malo-les-Bains where he lived out the rest of his life.

War memorials 
French towns and villages often gave priority to local sculptors when erecting their war memorials and therefore Ringot was often chosen to sculpt war memorials in the Nord department.  He also worked on war memorials for the Seine-Maritime area where he was a resident for some time.

Other works: Churches and architectural embellishments

Churchyard headstones

Recommended reading

 "Un grand sculpteur de notre Flandre maritime : Maurice Ringot, 1880–1951" by Laurentine Moritz-Bart. Published in 1981 in Dunkirk by Amis du vieux Dunkerque.

References

External links 
Article with photograph Coudekerque Branche monument aux morts

1880 births
1951 deaths
People from Bergues
Art Nouveau sculptors
20th-century French sculptors
French male sculptors